Nikola Blažičko (born 13 September 1977) is a former Croatian handball goalkeeper and co-trainer at Nettelstedt-Lübbecke.

Early life
Blažičko grew up in Rijeka. His parents Duško and Nada were also handball players, so him becoming a handball player himself was inevitable.

Career
Blažičko began his career in his hometown club Zamet in Rijeka. Soon he became a pivotal player and 1st goalkeeper at the club. 
In 2000 Blažičko moved to Split for 2 seasons before returning to Zamet. In 2004 he went to Croatian powerhouse Zagreb. With Zagreb Blažičko got to the finals of EHF Cup Winners' Cup in 2005.

The same year he played for the national team in World Championship in Tunis and Mediterranean Games in Almería where Croatia finished second. He also played at the 2006 European Championship in Switzerland where Croatia finished fourth losing the third-place match to Denmark 32:27.

Since 2007 he's been playing in TuS Nettelstedt-Lübbecke in Germany.

In March 2011 he was called up by Slavko Goluža to play for Croatia in the Euro-qualifiers.
 Unfortunately in June the same year Blažičko got injured losing his spot in the national team and being replaced with Venio Losert.

In 2015 Blažičko got another injury and didn't play for the vast majority of the season. At the end of the season his club Nettelstedt-Lübbecke was relegated to the 2. Bundesliga.

Honours
Zamet
Croatian Handball Championship U-18 
Third (1): 1994
Croatian Handball Championship U-19
Winner  (1): 1996
First B League
 Winner (1): 1995-96
First A League
Third (2): 1997-98, 1998-99 
Croatian Cup 
Runner-up(1): 2000

Split
First A League 
Third (1): 2000-01

Zagreb
First League 
Winner (2): 2004-05, 2005-06
Croatian Handball Cup 
Winner (2): 2005, 2006
EHF Cup Winners' Cup 
Runner-up (1): 2005

PSG
Coupe de France 
Winner (1): 2007

TuS Nettelstedt-Lübbecke
2nd Bundesliga
Winner (1): 2016-17

Croatia
2005 World Championship in Tunis - 2nd
2005 Mediterranean Games in Almería - 2nd
2006 European Championship in Switzerland - 4th

Individual
Best goalkeeper at Croatian Handball Championship U-19 - 1996
RK Zamet hall of fame - 2015

Orders
 Order of the Croatian Trefoil - 2005

References

External links
Nikola Blažičko EHF stats
Nikola  Blažičko 2010-present stats
Bundesliga profile

1977 births
Living people
Croatian male handball players
Croatian expatriate sportspeople in France
Croatian expatriate sportspeople in Germany
Handball players from Rijeka
RK Zamet players
Mediterranean Games silver medalists for Croatia
Competitors at the 2005 Mediterranean Games
Mediterranean Games medalists in handball